Sebastián Jurado Roca (born 28 September 1997) is a Mexican professional footballer who plays as a goalkeeper for Liga MX club Cruz Azul.

Club career

Veracruz
A native of Veracruz, Jurado joined the youth academy of Tiburones Rojos de Veracruz in 2013, going through the various ranks.

On 9 November 2018, Jurado made his debut in the Liga MX in Veracruz's 2–2 draw against Querétaro. On 3 April 2019, it was announced that Jurado had signed a three-year contract extension with Veracruz, with the player stating that he was "happy to stay" at the club, despite reported interest from other clubs. Following the disaffiliation of Veracruz from the Liga MX at the end of the club's 2019 Apertura campaign, Jurado became a free agent.

Cruz Azul
On 19 December 2019, Jurado officially joined Cruz Azul. On 18 February, he made his club debut in the 2020 CONCACAF Champions League against Portmore United, winning 2–1.

International career

Youth
Jurado was called up by Jaime Lozano to participate with the under-22 team that participated at the 2019 Toulon Tournament. He only appeared in the third place playoff against the Republic of Ireland, during the penalty shoot-out he would stop two of Ireland's shots, helping Mexico win the match.

Jurado also participated at the 2020 CONCACAF Olympic Qualifying Championship, appearing in three matches, where Mexico won the competition. He was subsequently called up to participate in the 2020 Summer Olympics. Jurado won the bronze medal with the Olympic team.

Career statistics

Club

Honours
Cruz Azul
Liga MX: Guardianes 2021
Supercopa de la Liga MX: 2022

Mexico U23
CONCACAF Olympic Qualifying Championship: 2020
Olympic Bronze Medal: 2020

Individual
Liga MX Best Rookie: 2018–19

References

External links
 
 
 
 Sebastián Jurado at Soccerstand

1997 births
Living people
Liga MX players
C.D. Veracruz footballers
Association football goalkeepers
Footballers from Veracruz
Mexican footballers
Footballers at the 2020 Summer Olympics
Olympic footballers of Mexico
Olympic medalists in football
Olympic bronze medalists for Mexico
Medalists at the 2020 Summer Olympics